Still Climbing is the fourth and final studio album by the American rock band Cinderella, released on November 8, 1994 by Mercury Records. The release of Still Climbing was delayed due to Tom Keifer losing his voice in 1991.

The album peaked at No. 178 on the Billboard 200.

Production
"Talk Is Cheap" first appeared during a Cinderella show in 1987, although the version on the album is longer than the original, with slower vocals. "Freewheelin" was an older song that had been written and demoed by the band in 1985, prior to the recording of their first album. "Hot & Bothered" had first appeared on Wayne's World: Music from the Motion Picture.

Critical receptionThe Encyclopedia of Popular Music called Still Climbing "a strong comeback." AllMusic deemed it "a gritty record that shows them building upon the bluesy hard rock of Heartbreak Station." The Morning Call described the songs as "glossy blues- and pop-oriented heavy metal." The Hamilton Spectator wrote: "While the music's hot, the messages are not. Keifer has simply run out of things to say aside from the coming-of-youth wisdom of 'The Road's Still Long'." The Indianapolis Star'' wrote that the songs "are 90 percent chorus ('Hot & Bothered' and 'Freewheelin') - and not even particularly creative ones at that; they're just repetitive phrases that might manage to come off well with a concert crowd."

Track listing
All songs are written by Tom Keifer, except "The Road's Still Long" by Keifer and Andy Johns, and "Hot & Bothered" by Keifer and Eric Brittingham.

Personnel
Cinderella
Tom Keifer – vocals, guitar, piano, co–producer
Jeff LaBar – guitar
Eric Brittingham – bass

Additional musicians
Kenny Aronoff – drums
Fred Coury – drums on "Hot & Bothered"
John Purdell – Hammond B3, piano, percussion, backing vocals
Jay Davidson – tenor and baritone saxophones (tracks 2, 9)
Steve Jankowski – trumpet and trombonium (track 2)
Rosanna McNamara – fiddle/violin (track 4)
Gary Corbett – keyboards (track 11)
Annette Hardeman, Charlene Holloway – backing vocals (tracks 4 to 6)
Luana Norman – backing vocals (track 10)
Carla Benson, Evette Benton – backing vocals (track 11)

Production
Duane Baron, John Purdell – producers, engineers, mixing at Unique Recording, New York
Brian Stover, Eric Gobel – assistant engineers
George Marino – mastering at Sterling Sound, New York

Charts

Album

Singles
Hot And Bothered

Bad Attitude Shuffle

References

Cinderella (band) albums
1994 albums
Albums produced by John Purdell
Albums produced by Duane Baron
Mercury Records albums